Kompagnistræde 32 is a Neoclassical property situated on Kompagnistræde, between Rådhusstræde and Hestemøllestræde, in the Old Town of Copenhagen, Denmark. Built with three storeys over a walk-out basement by Andreas Hallander in 1799, it was later expanded by one storey in the 1840s. A brewery was operated in a rear wing from its construction until at least the 1860s. The building was listed in the Danish registry of protected buildings and places in 1968.  An adjacent warehouse (Kompagnistræde 30) and the rear wings are not part of the heritage listing. The Danish Union of Teachers was headquartered in the building from 1957. The union is now based at nearby Vandkunsten 12 but their old headquarters is still owned by them and let out as office space.

History

18th century
The site was made up of two separate properties in the late 17th century. The eastern of these properties was listed in Copenhagen's first cadastre of 1689 as No. 17 in the city's West Quarter (Bester Kvarter), owned by skipper Ole Jensen. The western property was listed as No. 18 and belonged to Margrethe Simonsen (widow of Ole Simonsen). In the new cadastre of 1756, the old No. 17 was listed as No. 16 and belonged to shoemaker Stig Pedersen. The old No. 18 was listed as No. 17 and belonged to brewer Jochum Friderich Buus.

At the time of the 1787 census, No. 16 was home to five households. Johannes Baltzar, a wigmaker and the owner of the property, resided in the building with his wife Dorothea Soph.Møller, their three children (aged one to 11), an 18-year-old son from his first marriage, two wig-makers and a maid. Adam Møller, a smith employed at the naval dockyards on Myholm, resided in another dwelling with his wife Margretha Nels Datter and their 13-year-old son. Pehr Pehrsen, a ship carpenter at the naval dockyards, resided in a third dwelling with his wife Trine Jørgens Datter, their two children (aged three and eight) and his mother-in-law.  Hans Christian Lind, a joiner, resided in a fourth dwelling with his wife Maren Ohlsen and their two children (aged one to three). The fifth household consisted of the widow Karen Møller and her 38-year-old daughter Anne Møller. No. 17 was home to four households. Anna Elisabeth Møller, the widow of a brewer and the owner of the property, resided in the building with her two sons (aged three and six), her mother Dorothea Zedeler, two brewers, a caretaker and a maid. Ludolph Krohn (1736–1825), a senior military prosecutor (ober auditeur) at the Artillery Corps, resided in another dwelling with his wife Christiane Reuter, two sons (aged six and nine) and a maid. Raphael Jacob, a Jewish merchant, resided in the building with his wife Rebecca Herschel, their four children (aged 12 to 17) and one maid.

Friderich Borchsenius and his new building
No. 16 and No. 17 were both destroyed in the Copenhagen Fire of 1795, together with most of the other buildings in the area. The two fire sites were subsequently acquired by Frederik Borchsenius (1765–1831) and merged into a single property. The current building on the site was constructed for him by Andreas Hallander in 1799. On 5 August 1799, Borchsenius was granted citizenship as a brewer in Copenhagen. He established a brewery in a rear wing of his new property. In 1800, Borchsenius also purchased the estate Tronegård at Kongens Lyngby.

Frederik Borchsenius was the son of Johannes Borchsenius, a former owner of Ødemark Manor at Sorø (from 1771 to 1783), He had himself leased Juellund in 1792–1796. He married Bodil Malling (1762–1842) on 14 September 1792, whose late husband, Mathias Nielsen Lange (1754–1791), had preceded him as the tenant manager of the Juellund estate. Borchsenius had later also leased Bækkeskov from Charles August Selby in 1797. 

At the time of the 1801 census, Borchsenius' property was home to 40 residents in six households. Borchsenius resided on the ground flor with his wife Bodil Malling, their nine children (aged two to 15), two maids, two brewery workers and a caretaker. Anna Maria Løve, a 55-year-old widow, resided in the building with her nine-year-old daughter and one maid. Christian Bagge, a business assistant, resided in the building with his wife Ana Sophie Holm and one maid. Sophia Charlotte Lene von Asperen, a widow, resided in the building with two unmarried daughters (aged 39 and 41) and one maid. Andreas Sevald Holck, a retired brewer and former owner of the brewery on the other side of the street, resided in the building with his wife Ane Margrethe Holck (née Krag), five unmarried children (aged 24 to 28), a maid and a lodger. Christen Olsen, a master shoemaker, resided in the building with his wife Henriette Olsdatter, another shoemaker (employee) and two lodgers (a mason and a carpenter).

Borchsenius' property was listed in the new cadastre of 1806 as No. 121 in the West Quarter.

Jens and Anders Pandrup's brewery
At the time of the 1840 census, No. 121 was home to six households. Jens Andersen Pandrup, a new brewer, resided on the ground floor with his wife Ane Marie Jensen, their two children (aged eight and 16), six employees, two maids and two lodgers. Anna Wachtelbrenner, a 64-year-old widow, resided on the first floor with her son, daughter-in-law and their two children (aged one and four). Caroline Vilhelmine Christiane Margrete Avitander, a 35-year-old widow, resided on the second floor with her four children (aged seven to 12), and two maids. Gustav Julius Glasmacher, a clerk at Schultz' Bookshop, resided in the other second-floor apartment with his wife Cicilie Margarethe Horrebov and one maid. Niels Hansen, an undertaker, resided on the second floor with his wife Oline Charlotte Olsen and one maid. Ole Petersen, a sailor, resided in the basement with his wife Ane Sophia Margrethe Mos and their two children (aged 19 and 21). Johan Ferdinant Peltz, the proprietor of a tavern, resided in the basement with his wife Magrethe Davidsen, their one-year-old daughter and an eight-year-old foster daughter.

At the time of the 1845 census, Pandrup was still residing on the ground floor with his family and staff. Niels Hansen, the undertaker from the 1840 census, was now residing on the first floor with his wife and one maid. Hartvig Levy, a Jewish merchant, was also residing on the first floor with his wife Sara Levy, their three daughters (aged 15 to 19) and lodger Johan Frederik Meyer (architecture student). Jørgen Christian Møller, a civil servant, resided in the second-floor apartment to the left with his wife Christiane Sophie Haack, their 18-year-old daughter Anette Wilhelmine Møller, his sister Jacobine Wilhelmine Haack and one maid. Andreas Georg Borgen, a teacher at Von Vesten's Institute, resided in the second-floor apartment to the right with his wife Henriette Amalia Schøning, their one-year-old daughter, his aunt Christine Margrethe Borgen née Clausen, a wet nurse and a maid. The last two households resided in the basement. One of them consisted of smith Ole Øman, his wife Ane Marie Hansen, their three children (aged one to ten) and two lodgers. The other one consisted of workman Jens Petersen, his wife Johanne Larsen, their five children (aged two to 11) and a one-year-old foster son.

In 1850, Jens Andersen Pandrup was still residing on the ground floor with his family and staff. Hans Peter Malling, a merchant, had joined the undertaker on the first floor. Betty Georgia Theodofia Sørensen, widow of justice councillor Mathias Peter Sørensen, resided on the second floor with her five children (aged 11 to 23), one lodger and one maid. Elisabeth Charlotte Lund, another widow of a justice councillor, resided in the other second-floor apartment with her three children (aged 25 to 29) and one maid. Oline Laurine Brahde (mée Gramdsem, 1804–1888), widow of Johan Frederik Brahde (1799–1846), former landfoged on Saint John in the Danish West Indies, along with her five children (aged three to 18), a maid and lodger Jens Frederik Løwen.

Henrich Paulsen, principal of the College of Advanced Technology's workshops, resided in the other third-floor apartment with his wife Johanne Sarine Paulsen, their 26-year-old daughter Ida Maria Christian Poulsen and one maid. Ole Herm. Ømann was still residing with his family in the basement. Jens Petersen, a craftsman, resided in the basement with his wife Johanne Marie Petersen and their seven children (aged one to 15).

Pandrup's brewery was later passed to his son Anders. At the time of the 1860 census, he resided on the ground floor with his wife Ida Marie Abignel Pandrup, their three children (aged one to six), two maids and four male employees. Frederik Madsen (1834–1992), an actor associated with Folketeatret, was also part of the household as a lodger. Ane Marie Pandrup, Pandrup's widow, was still among the residents of the building but is listed in the census records together with a maid as a separate household. Undertaker Niels Hansen was also still among the residents of the building. Salomon Heimann David, a merchant, resided in the building with his wife Mariane David and two nieces (aged ten and eleven). Dorathe Magrethe Hidtman and Sophie Elenora Bargum Carstensohn, two women in their mid 50s, resided in another apartment. Christian Anders Theodor Sørensen, a civil servant in the Ministry of Financial Affairs, resided in the building with his wife Edel Margrethe Sørensen, their two children (aged five and seven) and one maid. Johanne Marie Hansthen, the widow of a merchant, resided in the building with two of her children (aged 42 and 43), Knud Peter Bakke, a master shoemaker, resided in the basement with his wife Fransine Marie Bakke and their three children (aged six to 12). Peter Olsen, a workman, resided in the other basement apartment with his wife Kirsten Olsen, their two children (aged six and eight) and one maid.

20th century

J. P. Quaade & Søn, a wholesale company, was based in the building for a while from some time after 1919.

The wholesale merchants (grosserer) Willumsen and Carl C. Larsen were both among the residents in 1919 (both car owners).

In 1957, Kompagnistræde 32 was acquired by the Danish Union of Teachers. In 1991, Kompagnistræde 32 was merged with Rådhusstræde 6. Kompagnistræde 32 was renovated by Mogens Didriksen (1918–1991) and K. E. Sand Kirk (born 1922) in 1959. Their work received an award from City Hall the following year.

Architecture

Kompagnistræde 32 was constructed by Andreas Hallander with three storeys over a walk-out basement but later expanded by one storey in 1846. The building is eight bays wide, of which the two outer bays are wider than the six slightly recessed central ones. The facade is finished with sandstone sill bands below the six central windows on the two lower floors, a Greek key frieze between the four central windows of the first and second floor and a cornice below the roof. An arched gate is located in the bay furthest to the left. The  main entrance to the building is located in the interior wall of the gateway. A basement entrance is located in the bay furthest to the right. The red tile roof features six dormer windows towards the street and two dormer windows towards the yard.

Today
The property is owned by the Danish Union of Teachers (Danmarks Lærerforening, lf) as of 2008. The building is let out as office space. It has a total floor area of 4,232 square metres distributed among 16 individual leases.

References

External links

 Friederich Borchsenius at geni.com
 Source
 Source

Listed residential buildings in Copenhagen
Neoclassical architecture in Copenhagen
Andreas Hallander buildings
Breweries in Copenhagen